Achaete-scute homolog 1 is a protein that in humans is encoded by the ASCL1 gene. Because it was discovered subsequent to studies on its homolog in Drosophila, the Achaete-scute complex, it was originally named MASH-1 for mammalian achaete scute homolog-1.

Function 

This gene encodes a member of the basic helix-loop-helix (BHLH) family of transcription factors. The protein activates transcription by binding to the E box (5'-CANNTG-3'). Dimerization with other BHLH proteins is required for efficient DNA binding. This protein plays a role in the neuronal commitment and differentiation and in the generation of olfactory and autonomic neurons. It is highly expressed in medullary thyroid cancer and small cell lung cancer and may be a useful marker for these cancers. The presence of a CAG repeat in the gene suggests that it may also play a role in tumor formation.

Role in neuronal commitment
Development of the vertebrate nervous system begins when the neural tube forms in the early embryo. The neural tube eventually gives rise to the entire nervous system, but first neuroblasts must differentiate from the neuroepithelium of the tube. The neuroblasts are the cells that undergo mitotic division and produce neurons. Asc is central to the differentiation of the neuroblasts and the lateral inhibition mechanism which inherently creates a safety net in the event of damage or death in these incredibly important cells.

Differentiation of the neuroblast begins when the cells of the neural tube express Asc and thus upregulate the expression of Delta, a protein essential to the lateral inhibition pathway of neuronal commitment. Delta can diffuse to neighboring cells and bind to the Notch receptor, a large transmembrane protein which upon activation undergoes proteolytic cleavage to release the intracellular domain (Notch-ICD). The Notch-ICD is then free to travel to the nucleus and form a complex with Suppressor of Hairless (SuH) and Mastermind. This complex acts as transcription regulator of Asc and accomplishes two important tasks. First, it prevents the expression of factors required for differentiation of the cell into a neuroblast. Secondly, it inhibits the neighboring cell's production of Delta. Therefore, the future neuroblast will be the cell that has the greatest Asc activation in the vicinity and consequently the greatest Delta production that will inhibit the differentiation of neighboring cells. The select group of neuroblasts that then differentiate in the neural tube are thus replaceable because the neuroblast's ability to suppress differentiation of neighboring cells depends on its own ability to produce Asc.
This process of neuroblast differentiation via Asc is common to all animals. Although this mechanism was initially studied in Drosophila, homologs to all proteins in the pathway have been found in vertebrates that have the same bHLH structure.

Autonomic nervous system development
In addition to its important role in neuroblast formation, Asc also functions to mediate autonomic nervous system (ANS) formation. Asc was initially suspected to play a role in the ANS when ASCL1 was found expressed in cells surrounding the dorsal aorta, the adrenal glands and in the developing sympathetic chain during a specific stage of development. Subsequent studies of mice genetically altered to be MASH-1 deficient revealed defective development of both sympathetic and parasympathetic ganglia, the two constituents of the ANS.

Interactions 

ASCL1 has been shown to interact with Myocyte-specific enhancer factor 2A.

References

Further reading

External links 
 
 

Transcription factors